The Entomological Society of Japan was founded in 1917 for the purpose of improving and promoting entomology in Japan.

References

External links 
 Official website : The Entomological Society of Japan
 Official website : The Entomological Society of Japan'

Entomological societies
1917 establishments in Japan
Scientific organizations established in 1917
Scientific organizations based in Japan